Çiftlikalanı is a village in the Gönen district of Balıkesir province in Turkey.

References

Villages in Gönen District